Jordan Walker may refer to:

Jordan Walker (baseball) (born 2002), American baseball player
Jordan Walker (basketball) (born 1999), American basketball player
Jordan Walker (politician) (born 1982/1983), Canadian politician
Jordan Walker-Pearlman (born 1967), American film director
Jordan Walker, one-half of country duo Walker McGuire